Viscachani (possibly from Aymara wisk'acha viscacha, -ni a suffix to indicate ownership, "the one with the viscacha (or viscachas)") is a  mountain in the Vilcanota mountain range in the Andes of Peru. It is located in the Cusco Region, Quispicanchi Province, Marcapata District, and in the Puno Region, Carabaya Province, Corani District. Viscachani lies southwest of Taruca Sayana and southeast of Jori Pintay, Tocllayoc and Huarisayana.

References

Mountains of Cusco Region
Mountains of Puno Region
Mountains of Peru